WBNV (93.5 FM) is a radio station broadcasting a classic hits format. Licensed to Barnesville, Ohio, United States, the station serves the Wheeling area. The station is currently owned by Joel Losego, through licensee AVC Communications, Inc.

References

External links
93BNV Online

BNV